Tensongs is the fourth studio album by the German synthpop band Hubert Kah, and their first English language album, released in 1986. It was produced by Michael Cretu and Armand Volker. Three singles were released from the album: "Limousine", "Something I Should Know" and "Love Is So Sensible". The opening track "Pogo the Clown" is based on the American serial killer John Wayne Gacy. "Get Strange" featured on the 1986 film Rad.

Track listing

Chart performance

Album

Singles
Limousine

Something I Should Know

Personnel
Hubert Kah
 Hubert Kemmler - vocals, backing vocals on "Love is So Sensible", arrangement
 Markus Löhr - guitar, keyboards, arrangement
 Klaus Hirschburger - bass, arrangement

Additional personnel
 Curt Cress - drums
 Lothar Krell - keyboard arrangement on "Limousine"
 Eddie Taylor - saxophone on "Something I Should Know"
 Ken Taylor - voice on "Lonesome Cowboy" and bass on "Explain the World in a Word"
 Thomas Dörr - backing vocals on "Love Is So Sensible"
 Judy Cheeks, Patricia Shockley, Victoria Miles - backing vocals on "Limousine"
 Michael Cretu - producer, arranger, digital and conventional keyboards
 Armand Volker - producer, arranger, guitar solo on "Love is So Sensible"
 Mike Schmidt - artwork

References

1986 albums
Hubert Kah albums